Camille Alaphilippe (1874 – after 1934) was a French sculptor.

Alaphilippe was born in Tours in 1874. At the age of 19, he was the pupil of Jean-Paul Laurens and Louis-Ernest Barrias to the École nationale supérieure des beaux-arts of Paris.

In 1898, at 24, he won the first great Prix de Rome in sculpture with a statue on the subject Caïn après la mort d'Abel poursuivi par la vengeance céleste or Caïn après la mort d'Abel entend la malédiction de l'Éternel.

He died in Algeria sometime after 1934.

Major works

Caïn après la mort d'Abel poursuivi par la vengeance céleste, 1898, École nationale supérieure des beaux-arts
La Consolation, 1901
Mystères douloureux, 1905, Mirabeau garden in Tours
La Femme au singe, 1908, museum of Petit Palais in Paris
Monument aux morts de Philippeville, Skikda in Algeria, transferred to Toulouse

External links

19th-century French sculptors
French male sculptors
20th-century French sculptors
Prix de Rome for sculpture
École des Beaux-Arts alumni
Artists from Tours, France
1874 births
Year of death unknown
19th-century French male artists